The 1998 Cork Junior A Hurling Championship was the 101st staging of the Cork Junior A Hurling Championship since its establishment by the Cork County Board. The championship began on 27 September 1998 and ended on 15 November 1998.

On 15 November 1998, Bride Rovers won the championship following a 2–10 to 0–13 defeat of Freemount in the final at Páirc Uí Chaoimh. It remains their only championship title.

References

1998 in hurling
Cork Junior Hurling Championship